The women's discus throw event at the 2011 Summer Universiade was held on 17 August.

Results

References
Results

External links

Discus
2011 in women's athletics
2011